Ciscarpathian may refer to:

 relative term, designating any region "on this side" of the Carpathians (lat. cis- / on this side), depending on a point of observation
 Ciscarpathian Romania, designation for Romanian regions "on this side" of the Carpathian Mountains, depending on a point of observation
 Ciscarpathian Ruthenia, designation for Ruthenian regions "on this side" of the Carpathian Mountains, depending on a point of observation
 Ciscarpathian Ukraine (or Prykarpattia), designation for Ukrainian regions on the north-eastern side of the Carpathian Mountains
 Vasyl Stefanyk Ciscarpathian National University, a university in the city of Ivano-Frankivsk, Ukraine

See also 

 Carpathia (disambiguation)
 Carpathian (disambiguation)
 Subcarpathia (disambiguation)
 Subcarpathian (disambiguation)
 Transcarpathia (disambiguation)
 Zakarpattia (disambiguation)